Twelfth Night (transliteration Dvenadtsataya noch) is a 1955 Soviet comedy film by Lenfilm based on Shakespeare's play Twelfth Night, or What You Will. The script was written by Yan Frid. The film was released in the Soviet Union on 21 November 1955, and in the United States on 3 March 1956.

Cast 
 Klara Luchko as Viola/Sebastian
 Alla Larionova as Olivia
 Vadim Medvedev as Duke Orsino
 Mikhail Yanshin as Sir Toby Belch
 Georgi Vitsin as Sir Andrew Aguecheek
 Vasili Merkuryev as Malvolio
 Bruno Freindlich as Feste
 Sergei Filippov as Fabian
 Anna Lisyanskaya as Maria
 Nina Urgant as maidservant
 Aleksandr Antonov as Sea Captain
 Sergei Lukyanov as Antonio

External links

 Twelfth Night on Lenfilm official site

1955 films
Lenfilm films
Films based on Twelfth Night
1955 comedy films
Soviet comedy films
Russian comedy films
1950s Russian-language films
Films directed by Yan Frid